Paul Andre Hutchins (born February 11, 1970) is a former American football tackle. He played 17 games for the Green Bay Packers from 1993 to 1995. He was drafted by the Packers in the 6th round (152nd pick) of the 1993 NFL Draft out of Western Michigan.

References 

1970 births
Living people
Players of American football from Chicago
American football offensive tackles
Western Michigan Broncos football players
Green Bay Packers players